William Nicholas Watson (born 18 April 1962 in Baghdad, Iraq) is an English chess Grandmaster titleholder.

Watson was British Rapidplay Chess Champion in 1992 and British Chess Champion in 1994. Boris Spassky once described his style of play as that of a drunk with a machine gun.

Watson has long been inactive as a competitive chess player, and is a tax attorney and partner at Slaughter and May.

References

External links 
 

1962 births
Living people
People from Baghdad
Chess grandmasters
English chess players